The Southern Finland Regional State Administrative Agency is one of the six Regional State Administrative Agencies. Its administrative area consists of five regions, 16 sub-regions, and 88 municipalities.

Regions

References 

Southern Finland Province
Local government in Finland